The 1926–27 season was the 54th season of competitive football in Scotland and the 37th season of the Scottish Football League.

Scottish League Division One 

Champions: Rangers
Relegated: Greenock Morton, Dundee United

Scottish League Division Two 

Promoted: Bo'ness United, Raith Rovers
Relegated: Nithsdale Wanderers

Scottish Cup 

Last years runners-up Celtic were winners of the Scottish Cup after a 3–1 final win over East Fife.

Other honours

National

County 

. * aggregate over two legs

Highland League

Junior Cup 
Rutherglen Glencairn were winners of the Junior Cup after a 2–1 win over Cambuslang Rangers in the final.

Scotland national team 

Scotland were joint winners with England in the 1926–27 British Home Championship.

Key:
 (H) = Home match
 (A) = Away match
 BHC = British Home Championship

Notes and references

External links 
 Scottish Football Historical Archive

 
Seasons in Scottish football